The Ministry of Ports Development is a Ministry of the Government of Maharashtra. 
state.

The Ministry is headed by a cabinet level Minister. Dadaji Bhuse is Current Minister of Ports Development Government of Maharashtra.

Head office

List of Cabinet Ministers

List of Ministers of State

References

Government ministries of Maharashtra